Charles Edward Montagu, 1st Duke of Manchester,  (previously 4th Earl of Manchester) (20 January 1722) was a British aristocrat and statesman.

Early life
Charles was born  into the Noble House of Montagu. He was the eldest son of the former Anne Yelverton and Robert Montagu, 3rd Earl of Manchester. Among his siblings were Lady Anne Montagu (wife of James Howard, 3rd Earl of Suffolk) and politicians the Hon. Robert Montagu and the Hon. Heneage Montagu, both MPs for Huntingdonshire.  After his father's death in 1683, his mother married Charles Montagu, 1st Earl of Halifax.

His paternal grandparents were Edward Montagu, 2nd Earl of Manchester and his second wife Lady Anne Rich (a daughter of Robert Rich, 2nd Earl of Warwick).  His maternal grandparents were Sir Christopher Yelverton, 1st Baronet of Easton Maudit and Anne Twysden (daughter of Sir William Twysden, 1st Baronet).

He was educated at Trinity College, Cambridge, and succeeded to his father's earldom in 1683. Warmly sympathizing with the Whig revolution of 1688, he attended William and Mary at their coronation, and fought under William at the Boyne.

Career
In 1697, he was sent as an Envoy to Venice to try to procure the release of British sailors, but the Venetians proved unwilling to negotiate.  On his return in 1698, he was appointed a privy councillor.  The following year he was sent as English Ambassador to France, remaining there until the outbreak of war in 1701.  He was then briefly appointed Secretary of State for the Southern Department, a post he held between January and May 1702.  He was then out of office until again sent to Venice, as Ambassador, but during his time there in 1707 and 1708, this negotiations (to persuade Venice to adhere to the Grand Alliance) were again unsuccessful.

In 1714, he received an appointment in the household of George I, by whom on 28 April 1719 he was created Duke of Manchester.

In 1719, he was one of the main subscribers to the Royal Academy of Music, a corporation that produced baroque opera on the stage. He also served as High Steward of the University of Cambridge from 1697 to 1722.

Personal life
On 19 February 1690, Lord Manchester was married the Hon. Doddington Greville (1671–1720). She was a daughter of Robert Greville, 4th Baron Brooke of Beauchamps Court and Anne (née Doddington) Greville (who married Thomas Hoby after the death of Lord Brooke in 1676). Together, they were the parents of:

 Lady Doddington Montagu (–1774), who died unmarried.
 William Montagu, 2nd Duke of Manchester (1700–1739), who married Lady Isabella Montagu, a daughter of John Montagu, 2nd Duke of Montagu and Lady Mary Churchill (the youngest surviving daughter of John Churchill, 1st Duke of Marlborough).
 Lady Charlotte Montagu (1705–1759), who married Pattee Byng, 2nd Viscount Torrington, the eldest son of George Byng, 1st Viscount Torrington.
 Robert Montagu, 3rd Duke of Manchester (–1762), who married Harriet Dunch, daughter and co-heiress of Edmund Dunch.

He died on 20 January 1722.

Ancestry

See also
List of deserters from James II to William of Orange

References

1660s births
1722 deaths
Alumni of Trinity College, Cambridge
British Secretaries of State
Diplomatic peers
Charles 1
Ambassadors of England to France
Lord-Lieutenants of Huntingdonshire
Members of the Privy Council of England
Members of the Privy Council of Great Britain
Charles Montagu, 01st Duke of Manchester
Williamite military personnel of the Williamite War in Ireland
Ambassadors of Great Britain to the Republic of Venice
17th-century English diplomats
18th-century diplomats
Members of the Kit-Kat Club